Translation is the transfer of a bishop from one episcopal see to another. The word is from the Latin , meaning "carry across" (another religious meaning of the term is the translation of relics).

This can be

From suffragan bishop status to diocesan bishop
From coadjutor bishop to diocesan bishop
From one country's episcopate to another
From diocesan bishop to archbishop

References

Anglicanism
Episcopacy in the Catholic Church
Christian terminology